Bar Finals may refer to:

 Bar examination#England and Wales
 Bar Vocational Course
 Barrister#Qualifying as a barrister